The Ven  and Hon.  Edward Chichester  was an Irish Anglican priest.

He was ordained deacon at Belfast in 1699; and priest at Lisburn the following year. He was collated Archdeacon of Tuam on 10 July 1703 and resigned on 12 September 1706.

Notes

Irish Anglicans
Archdeacons of Tuam
Year of birth missing
Year of death missing